Cyganówka  is a village in the administrative district of Gmina Wilga, within Garwolin County, Masovian Voivodeship, in eastern-central part of Poland.

References

Villages in Garwolin County